Paul L. Ayers is a major general in the Rhode Island Air National Guard.

Career
Ayers began his United States Air Force training at Vance Air Force Base in 1982. Upon completion, he became a Northrop T-38 Talon instructor pilot with the 25th Flying Training Squadron. In 1985, he transferred to the 71st Flying Training Wing.

In 1987, Ayers was assigned to Langley Air Force Base as a McDonnell Douglas F-15 Eagle pilot. Later, he became a McDonnell Douglas CF-18 Hornet instructor at CFB Bagotville. The following year, he was assigned to the 143d Airlift Squadron at Quonset Air National Guard Base as a Lockheed C-130 Hercules pilot. Soon after, he transferred to the Rhode Island National Guard. In 2002, Ayers assumed command of the 143d Airlift Squadron.

In 2008, he was named Assistant Adjutant General – Air of the Rhode Island National Guard. During this time, he also served as Air National Guard Assistant to the Command of the Twenty-Fourth Air Force at Lackland Air Force Base. After a brief time with the Central Security Service, he was assigned to Air Education and Training Command as Air National Guard Assistant to the Commander in 2012.

Awards he has received during his career include the Legion of Merit, the Meritorious Service Medal with oak leaf cluster, the Air Medal, the Aerial Achievement Medal with oak leaf cluster, the Air Force Achievement Medal, the Outstanding Unit Award with two oak leaf clusters, the Organizational Excellence Award, the Combat Readiness Medal, the National Defense Service Medal with service star, the Armed Forces Expeditionary Medal, the Southwest Asia Service Medal with service star and the Global War on Terrorism Expeditionary Medal.

Education
University of New Hampshire
Squadron Officer School
Defense Language Institute
Air Command and Staff College
Air War College
Western Governors University

References

United States Air Force generals
United States Air Force personnel of the Gulf War
Recipients of the Legion of Merit
Recipients of the Air Medal
University of New Hampshire alumni
Defense Language Institute alumni
Air Command and Staff College alumni
Air War College alumni
Living people
Year of birth missing (living people)
Western Governors University alumni